FC Dava is a Moldovan football club based in Soroca, Moldova. They play in the Moldovan "B" Division, the third division in Moldovan football.

League results 
{|class="wikitable"
|-bgcolor="#efefef"
! Season
! Div.
! Pos.
! Pl.
! W
! D
! L
! GS
! GA
! P
!Cup
!colspan=2|Europe
!Top Scorer (League)
!Head Coach  Vasile Zabrian
|-
|align=center|2009–10
|align=center rowspan=3|3rd"North"
|align=center|5/13
|align=center|24
|align=center|13
|align=center|7
|align=center|4
|align=center|58
|align=center|32
|align=center|46
|align=center|Round of 16
|align=center colspan=2|—
|align=left|
|align=left| Vasile Zabrian
|-
|align=center|2010–11
|align=center|3/10
|align=center|18
|align=center|9
|align=center|4
|align=center|5
|align=center|30
|align=center|21
|align=center|31
|align=center|Round of 32
|align=center colspan=2|—
|align=left|
|align=left| Vasile Zabrian
|-
|align=center|2016–17
|align=center|6/11
|align=center|19
|align=center|7
|align=center|4
|align=center|8
|align=center|23
|align=center|26
|align=center|25
|align=center|2nd PR
|align=center colspan=2|—
|align=left| Usatii Denis 
|align=left| Pavel Bachinin
|}

External links
FC Dava on Soccerway.com
FC Dava on Facebook.com

Dava, FC
Dava, FC
2009 establishments in Moldova